Bradford Cohen is an American criminal defense lawyer, civil litigator and legal analyst.

Cohen's clients include Drake, Vanilla Ice, Deandre Baker, Polo G, DMX, Dennis Rodman, YNW Melly, Corey Lewandowski, NLE Choppa, Scott Storch, Kodak Black, Lil Wayne, Pooh Shiesty, Benjamin Kickz, A Boogie Wit Da Hoodie, Rod Wave and Plaxico Burress.   He successfully represented Lil Wayne and Kodak Black to receive federal pardons from Donald Trump in 2021.

Cohen is a long-time supporter of Trump, and Trump has referred to Cohen as "a brilliant guy." He was a contestant on the second season of The Apprentice.

Cohen is a graduate of Nova Southeastern Shepard Broad Law School and has been a member of the Florida Bar since 1997. He is the past President of the Broward County Association of Criminal Defense Lawyers, Received multiple hattrick awards for 3 Not Guilty Jury Verdicts, and has made multiple appearances in Super Lawyers in the area of Criminal and Civil Trial work.

References

External links
 Official Website

Living people
Nova Southeastern University alumni
20th-century American lawyers
21st-century American lawyers
American drink industry businesspeople
Florida lawyers
Florida Republicans
Participants in American reality television series
The Apprentice (franchise) contestants
Year of birth missing (living people)